The Grand Mosque of the Sultan of Riau on Penyengat Island is located outside Tanjung Pinang on Bintan island, Indonesia. The mosque was built in 1844 and is today one of Tanjung Pinang's most popular attractions for visitors.

Penyengat Island
Penyengat Island was the royal seat of the once powerful Sultanate of Riau-Lingga and it is famous for its viceroys of Riau during the 18th century conflict with European powers. Penyengat still bears the traces of its illustrious and mystic past. Ruins, abandoned for almost 70 years, are recently restored. The old ruler's palace and royal tombs, among them the grave of the respected Raja Ali Haji, who also was creator and author of the first Malay Language grammar book, are among the legacies left by the Riau Sultanate. Still in use is the old vice-royal mosque, the Mesjid Raya.

See also
 Islam in Indonesia
 List of mosques in Indonesia

Mosques in Indonesia
Buildings and structures in the Riau Islands
Religious buildings and structures completed in 1844
Tanjungpinang